East Timor–Mexico relations are the diplomatic relations between the Democratic Republic of Timor-Leste and the United Mexican States. Both nations are members of the United Nations.

History
During the 1999 East Timorese independence referendum, violence in East Timor (Timor-Leste) intensified. Internal pressure led UNAMET to work in forced marches until 30 August 1999, the day the referendum was to take place. To conduct the referendum, the United Nations requested Mexico's Federal Electoral Institute to provide technical assistance to East Timor in two specific areas, in the creation of an electoral registry and in the logistics for the elections. Mexico's support began on 2 June and ended on 30 August of the same year.

On 20 May 2002, East Timor obtained its independence from Indonesia. The independence ceremony was attended by Mexican Foreign Undersecretary Miguel Marín Bosch. Mexico immediately recognized the independence of East Timor, becoming the second Latin American nation to do so. As a non-permanent member of the United Nations Security Council, Mexico approved Resolution 1414 to admit East Timor to the United Nations. On 26 September 2003, both nations established diplomatic relations.

In May 2008, East Timorese Foreign Minister Zacarias da Costa paid an official visit to Mexico, becoming the highest-level government official from East Timor to visit Mexico. During a meeting with Mexican Foreign Minister Patricia Espinosa Cantellano, both nations discussed an interest in strengthening the bilateral relationship between both nations. Both Ministers agreed to cooperate within the framework of the UN, where issues of common interest could be found. In April 2014, a delegation from East Timor attended the first High Level Meeting of the Global Partnership for Effective Development Cooperation in Mexico City.

High-level visits
High-level visits from East Timor to Mexico
 Foreign Minister Zacarias da Costa (2008)
 Minister of the Economy João Mendes Goncalves (2010)

High-level visits from Mexico to East Timor
 Foreign Undersecretary Miguel Marín Bosch (2002)

Trade

In 2018, trade between East Timor and Mexico totaled US$287 thousand dollars. East Timor's main exports to Mexico include: parts for telephone devices; merchandise for the promotion of the coffee industry; and reactance coils. Mexico does not have any registered exports to East Timor.

Diplomatic missions
 East Timor is accredited to Mexico from its embassy in Washington, D.C., United States.
 Mexico is accredited to East Timor from its embassy in Jakarta, Indonesia and maintains an honorary consulate in Dili.

References 

Bilateral relations of East Timor
Bilateral relations of Mexico